Galopin can refer to:

Galopin, a British Thoroughbred racehorse

People with the surname Galopin
Alexandre Galopin, a Belgian businessman
Arnould Galopin, a French author
Claude Galopin, a French automotive engineer
Pierre Galopin, a French military officer

French-language surnames